The Center for American Politics and Citizenship (CAPC) is a non-partisan Government and Politics research center at the University of Maryland, College Park

The Center's stated mission is that it "provides citizens and policy-makers with research on critical issues related to the United States's political institutions, processes, and policies. CAPC is a non-partisan, non-profit research institution within the Department of Government and Politics of the College of Behavioral and Social Sciences at the University of Maryland, College Park."

The organization is responsible for maintaining the Maryland Elections Center website, which provides resources to verify voter registration, locate polling places, and search the Maryland Campaign Finance Database online. The Center is also the conduit for its very own Maryland Internship program, which places qualified undergraduates in a variety of Government-related offices.

Board of directors
The Center for American Politic's Advisory Board governs by broad policies and objectives, formulated and agreed upon by the director and staff. These include assigning priorities and ensuring the organization's capacity to carry out programs by continually reviewing its work and assisting in all stages of development including building an endowment for academic chairs, fellowship programs, a Center library, and other programs.

 Paul S. Hernson, Ph.D., Director
 The Hon. Charles Thomas McMillen, Chair
 The Hon. Jack Buechner, Vice Chair
 Ms. Amy L. Tenney, Secretary
 The Hon. Michael E. Arrington
 Ms. Mimi Dawson
 Mr. Al From
 Ms. Karen L. Haas
 Ms. Monica M. Healy
 Mr. Gerard C. Higgins
 The Hon. John A. Hurson
 The Hon. Glenn F. Ivey
 Ms. Rosalie M. LaMonica
 Mr. Scott Richman
 Mr. Anthony J. Roda
 Ms. Susan W. Turnbull
 Senator Joseph Tydings

The Center also employs graduate research assistants as well as undergraduate research assistants.

External links
Official site

Civic and political organizations of the United States
University of Maryland, College Park research centers
University of Maryland College of Behavioral and Social Sciences